Agonopsis is a genus of poachers native to the Pacific Ocean.

Species
There are currently four recognized species in this genus:
 Agonopsis asperoculis W. F. Thompson, 1916
 Agonopsis chiloensis (Jenyns, 1840) (Snailfish)
 Agonopsis sterletus (C. H. Gilbert, 1898) (Southern spearnose poacher)
 Agonopsis vulsa (D. S. Jordan & C. H. Gilbert, 1880) (Northern spearnose poacher)

References

Agoninae
 
Taxa named by Theodore Gill